Nirmal Basti  is a Village Development Committee in Parsa District in the Narayani Zone of southern Nepal. At the time of the 2011 Nepal census, it had a population of 9772 people living in 2055 individual households. The sex ratio is 95.48, meaning there are slightly more females than males. For comparison, the Parsa District has an average sex ratio of 108.21

References

Populated places in Parsa District